Palmer River Gold Company Dredge is a heritage-listed dredge on the Palmer River at Strathleven, Palmer, Shire of Cook, Queensland, Australia. It was added to the Queensland Heritage Register on 17 June 2003.

History 
The Palmer River Gold Company N.L., a Cairns company, took up ground along the Palmer River between Frome and Strathleven and carried out dredging operations between 1926 and 1935. The company originally estimated that 2.6 million cubic metres of auriferous material (rocks bearing gold) was available but after four years work it was found that the yields were less than 25% of the anticipated values. The all-steel bucket dredge and pontoon was built by Messrs Chas. Ruwolt Pty Ltd of Richmond, Victoria and shipped to Cooktown then railed to Laura in mid 1930. The largest portion of the road was made by the company.

The dredge was erected under the supervision of Mr William Condron, consulting engineer for Ruwolt Pty Ltd, and Mr Walter Baker, the dredging company's General Manager. The dredge was capable of treating 50,000 cubic yards per month and had 31 buckets of 5 cubic foot capacity. Dredging operations commenced at the end of December 1930 and were carried on into the wet season. However a photograph in 1932 (John Oxley Library: neg. 31/31) shows the dredge partly submerged and damaged by floodwaters. The date that the dredge ceased operation and was finally abandoned has not been confirmed.

Description 

The place contains the pontoon and partly intact superstructure and plant of a steam powered bucket dredge. The pontoon measures . Ironwork throughout remains in good condition with the exception of the pontoon's rear plating which has corroded through at water level. All corrugated iron cladding has been removed but the iron frame and decking remains intact.

A twin cylinder horizontal steam engine has been removed and now lies alongside. The cog-train drive for the bucket chain remains but the chain now holds only two buckets. The washing trommel, jig mount and a large gravel pump remain in place. The boiler which was mounted on the starboard/right hand side may still be in place under the sand bar covering this area. Items of plant removed and left in the river bed and on the eastern bank include - the engine mount, camshaft, iron chimney section, a winch drum and 13 buckets.

The surviving plant includes:
 Steam gravel pump - W H Allen Son & Co Ld Bedford England Conqueror 14
 Two-cylinder horizontal steam engine (not in situ) - no brand
 Superstructure steel beams - Dorman Long & Co Mbro

Heritage listing 
Palmer River Gold Company Dredge was listed on the Queensland Heritage Register on 17 June 2003 having satisfied the following criteria.

The place is important in demonstrating the evolution or pattern of Queensland's history.

The dredge is significant as rare surviving evidence of contemporary technology for alluvial dredging and gold mining in Australia in the 1920s.

The place demonstrates rare, uncommon or endangered aspects of Queensland's cultural heritage.

The dredge is significant as rare surviving evidence of contemporary technology for alluvial dredging and gold mining in Australia in the 1920s.
It is the earliest surviving steam dredge in Queensland, and possibly in Australia, and is a rare extant example of early dredge construction.

The place is important in demonstrating the principal characteristics of a particular class of cultural places.

It is the earliest surviving steam dredge in Queensland, and possibly in Australia, and is a rare extant example of early dredge construction. The dredge's survival despite more than 60 years annual exposure to the full force of wet season river flooding is a testament to its construction.

The place is important in demonstrating a high degree of creative or technical achievement at a particular period.

The dredge demonstrates achievements in overcoming considerable access, transport and operational constraints.

References

Attribution

External links 

Queensland Heritage Register
Palmer, Queensland
Articles incorporating text from the Queensland Heritage Register
Dredgers
Buildings and structures in Far North Queensland
1930s establishments in Australia